Shivnagar Vidya Prasarak Mandal (SVPM) [svpm.org.in] is an educational campus located in Malegaon (Bk.), Baramati in Pune district Maharashtra.This is prominent college of Baramati.
Shivnagar Vidya Prasarak Mandal, Shivnagar was constituted in 1972 to bring the stream of education from pre - primary to diploma and degree level in the rural areas. It is sponsored by the Malegaon Sahakari Sakhar Karkhana Ltd. Shivanagar, Tal. Baramati Dist. Pune. The educational institutions are run under the visionary and dynamic leadership of Hon'ble Shri. Sharadchandraji Pawar, Minister for Agricultural & Food Govt. of India who is the president. Respected Shri Chandrarao Taware is the Vice President. The SVPM trust conducts professional higher education in Engineering, Pharmacy & Management.

Educational Institutions 

 Institute of Pharmacy
 College of Pharmacy
 Institute of Engineering and Technology
 College of Engineering
 Institute of Management

Courses Offered

Diploma Courses
 Civil Diploma
 Electronics and Telecommunication Engineering
 Electrical Engineering
 Mechanical Engineering
 Computer Engineering
 Automobile Engineering

Degree Courses
 Civil Engineering
 Mechanical Engineering
 Electronics and Telecommunication Engineering
 Computer Engineering
 Information Technology Engineering
 Electrical Engineering

PG in Engineering
 Mechanical Engineering
 Electronics and Telecommunication Engineering

Universities and colleges in Maharashtra
Education in Pune district
Educational institutions established in 1972
1972 establishments in Maharashtra
Baramati